Operation Peninsula Strike was a series of raids conducted by American troops from 9 to 13 June 2003 as part of Operation Iraqi Freedom, carried out by members of Task Force Ironhorse on a peninsula alongside the Tigris River near Balad, Iraq. In the operation US forces sought to target members of the Ba'ath Party, paramilitary, and subversive units. Specifically, US Forces were to hit five objectives simultaneously, detain the targets and screen them for intelligence.

The operation
Attacking from helicopters, small boats and in armored vehicles, American forces set up road blocks and began a large raid with a force of over 1,000 soldiers, who quickly captured 397 suspects. Among those who were targeted for capture were two persons on the 'Most Wanted List': Major General Abul Ali Jasmin, the former Minister of Defense, and Brigadier General Abdullah Ali Jasmin, former head of the military academy. However, none of the targets were at the locations attacked. Of the 397 initially detained, most were released within days of the operation.

On the last day of the operation, a force of Iraqi insurgents attacked a patrol from the 4th Infantry Division, which was involved in the operation. The insurgents fired rocket-propelled grenades at the 4th Infantry Division tank patrol. The tanks returned fire, killing four attackers and forcing the others to flee. Later, backed by Apache helicopters, the U.S. forces pursued the remaining attackers, killing another 23.

Numerous weapons caches were seized.

Units involved
Included elements of the:
3d Brigade, U.S. 4th Infantry Division
173d Airborne Brigade
3d Squadron, U.S. 7th Cavalry Regiment, 3d Infantry Division
1st Battalion, U.S. 8th Infantry Regiment
720th Military Police Battalion
57th Aviation Battalion
159th Aviation Battalion
2d Battalion, 503d Infantry Regiment
elements from 104th Military Intelligence Battalion, U.S. 4th Infantry Division
elements from 519th Military Intelligence Battalion

See also

Operation Peninsula Strike followed Operation Planet X and preceded Operation Desert Scorpion.

References

Global Security: Operation Peninsula Strike

Military operations of the Iraq War involving the United States
Military operations of the Iraq War in 2003
Iraqi insurgency (2003–2011)